Bhijer is a small village which is in the north-west part of Nepal, located in She Phoksundo Rural Municipality ward no.5 in Dolpa district at the altitude of 3800m high from the sea level.

In ancient times, the local name for Bhijer was "Jicher"( Byi, gCher).

References

External links
UN map of the municipalities of Dolpa District

Populated places in Dolpa District